William Foster (1913 – after 1933) was an English professional footballer who played in the Football League for Mansfield Town.

References

1913 births
date of death missing
English footballers
Association football forwards
English Football League players
Mansfield Town F.C. players
People from Hucknall
Footballers from Nottinghamshire